{{DISPLAYTITLE:C639H1006N168O196S8}}
The molecular formula C639H1006N168O196S8 (molar mass: 14434.353 g/mol) may refer to:

 Granulocyte-macrophage colony-stimulating factor
 Sargramostim

Molecular formulas